Eroeadae or Eroiadai was a deme in ancient Athens of the phyle of Antiochis.

Its site is unlocated.

References

Ancient Athens
Populated places in ancient Attica
Former populated places in Greece
Demoi
Lost ancient cities and towns